Frederick Fox may refer to:

 Frederick Fox (cricketer) (1863–1935), English cricketer
 Frederick A. Fox (1931–2011), American composer
 Frederic Fox (1917–1981), Keeper of Princetoniana at Princeton University
 Frederick Fox (milliner) (1931–2013), Australian-born English milliner

See also
 Freddie Fox (disambiguation)
 Fred Fox (disambiguation)